Susan Fisher Sterling is an American art curator, currently the Director of the National Museum of Women in the Arts in Washington, D.C. She has been an activist in the Feminist art movement in the United States since the early 1980s.

Education 
Sterling holds a Master's and Ph.D. in Art History from Princeton University, and specialized in Modern and Contemporary art.

Career 
Sterling became an associate curator of the National Museum of Women in the Arts in 1988. Two years later, she was promoted to curator of modern and contemporary art, and again to chief curator in 1994. She became deputy director in 2001, and finally Director of the National Museum of Women in the Arts in 2008, and has held the position since.

Awards 
Sterling was awarded Orders of Merit from Brazil and Norway. She was awarded the President's Award by the Women's Caucus for Art in 2009. In 2011, she received Airtable's 30th Honor's award.

References 

Directors of museums in the United States
Feminist artists
American art curators
American women curators
Princeton University alumni
Living people
Year of birth missing (living people)
21st-century American women
Washington University in St. Louis alumni